Vistal Gdynia is a handball club from Gdynia, Poland.

Results

Polish First Division:
Winners (1): 2012, 2017
Runners-Up (1): 2015
Polish Women's Cup:
Winners (3): 2014, 2015, 2016
EHF Challenge Cup:
Semifinalist: 2010

European record

External links
 Official website
 EHF Profile

Polish handball clubs
1990 establishments in Poland
Handball clubs established in 1990
Sport in Gdynia